Gurun Graduate Institute was established in  as degree granting institution offers Executive master degree in public administration. The name Gurun was based on 'gurun' name conceptualised by its current director Demberel Dorjchuluun. Gurun means being local leader and global partner. GGI now offers degree of executive master in public administration and partners with Harvard Business Publishing for executive education. The institute only offers its partners certificate programs in Mongolian and English as bilingual and local pioneer in blended learning in higher education. Gurun Graduate Institute has partnered with Courses, offering business courses in two languages for undergraduate students of higher education institutes (colleges and universities) in Mongolia.

As an executive education leader, blended learning pioneer Guren Graduate Institute is now developing online courses for K12 students, undergraduate students, professional education including civil aviation courses with IATA and financial courses with New York Institute of Finance.

The institute also partners with McKinsey Academy for training its consultants for mining business sector. As a professional educational provider the Gurun Graduate Institute has worked with Central Bank of Mongolia, Ministry of Finance and National Academy of Governance.

Other projects the institute has started are Family Health Center, Tsakhim Mongol(e-country project), Food and Agribusiness, Airport City and strategic network projects like Global Managers Club and Public Management Institute.

Organizations based in Ulaanbaatar